Çanakkale Naval Museum is a museum in Çanakkale , Turkey

Collection
The collections in the museum are classified as follows
Historical boats
Historical galley
Atatürk's boat
Emperyal Boats of the sultanate (Ottoman Empire
Boats used in Ottoman era
Other boats

Metallic exhibits
Weapons
Navigation tools
Stamps and seals
Lanterns
Medals and signs
Clocks

Wooden exhibits
Ships
Coats of arms and tughras (seal of the sultan) 
Figureheads
Rigging

Stone exhibits
Lithography
Tomb stones
Inscriptions
Fountains

Art
Oil paintings
Watercolor painting 
Charcoal painting
Engravings

Textile exhibits
Uniforms
Flags

Paper exhibits
Hand written documents
Firmans (decrees of the Ottoman sultans)

References

Buildings and structures in Çanakkale Province
Museums in Turkey
Naval museums in Turkey
Tourist attractions in Çanakkale Province
Museums established in 1982